Champlain's Dream: The European Founding of North America is a biography written by American historian, David Hackett Fischer and published in 2008. It is a biography of French "soldier, spy, master mariner, explorer, cartographer, artist and "Father of New France"", Samuel de Champlain. 
In this book, Fischer examines more closely Champlain's personal impact on the establishment of a French colony in the New World - securing royal support despite opposition from formidable foes like Marie de Medici and Cardinal Richelieu, negotiating with "Indian nations" and imbuing the new colony with the values of humanism. He is also remembered for having survived 27 crossings of the North Atlantic in 37 years - without ever losing a ship. Despite never being the "senior official" of New France, Champlain functioned as an absolute ruler and as Fischer shows, his vision for New France (a vision that was very much a product of Champlain's upbringing and experiences) helps explain both its triumphs and failures.

Fischer has substantial experience using the life and perspective of a great leader to tell a broader historical narrative; he employed a similar structure in Washington's Crossing for which he received a Pulitzer Prize in 2005.

Main thesis 

Champlain's dreams as an explorer and cartographer are documented in his own writings - one of them was to find a North American passage to China. Ostensibly, his overarching dream was to establish a successful French colony in the New World. This required Champlain to:
 secure political support in the French court 
Between 1535 and 1601, six French settlements in the New World ended in failure. Champlain carefully studied the experiences of earlier explorers like Jacques Cartier and Pierre de Chauvin. But then, he needed to convince men like the duc de Sully, the King's Chief Minister who thought American colonies were against French national interest as they distracted from business at home.  Other noblemen of the time would have preferred domestic reforms to expansion abroad and Champlain stayed alert to their machinations. 
 and make difficult administrative decisions once in the New World
Even after royal support could be secured, "rival merchants, competing seaports and the representatives of foreign powers" conspired against the colonies of 'New France' and it fell to Champlain to lead his men to deal with all kinds of problems. The explorers had to claim land, protect it from the "Indian nations" and convince French subjects to emigrate to the New World – a prospect they were much less enthusiastic about than Britishers fleeing religious persecution. 
Even after all of this was done and the colonies began to run smoothly, he had to regulate unlicensed trade on the rivers and build trading posts to make sure the colony stayed profitable.

But as Fischer puts forward in this book, Champlain's dream went further than that. He envisioned that this colony would be "a place where people of different cultures could live together in amity and concord" and hoped that North America could be this place. He dreamed of collective action, humanistic ideals like peace and tolerance and a Francophone legacy in the new world. Fischer makes frequent reference to Champlain's "grand design" or his sweeping vision.

What Fischer seeks to do in this book, after articulating this aspiration, is ask a series of questions about why this man believed in it and what steps he took to make it a reality.

Fischer's treatment of Champlain 
Fischer rejects the view that Champlain was just another European mercenary looking to seize lands and enslave native populations like many other early British and Spanish explorers in North America. He writes admiringly of Champlain's humanist values - that he treated "Indian nations" with respect and pursued peaceful coexistence through policies of "trade alliances, cultural tolerance and intermarriage".

An explanation for Champlain's humanism 
 Growing up in port city of Brouage

Fischer describes the unique character of Brouage, the town of Champlain's youth as the "salty broth in which our hero was cooked".
Due to its thriving economy and "cosmopolitan nature", the man historians know as Champlain's father managed to work his way up from a humble ship's pilot to a naval captain in the King's Marine. Thus, Champlain's early life was one of visible opportunity and upwards mobility, an experience that Fischer claims Champlain's later optimism and persistence is a result of.

Brouage was in a region that was deeply suspicious of Paris, the seat of power but enjoyed a "broad diversity of language, culture, religion and ecology". This upbringing inculcated in Champlain an exceptional curiosity about cultural differences. He learned Dutch, English and Spanish in school and from his neighbors and "the art of navigation" from his father. Despite not having a 'classical' education, Samuel de Champlain became skilled in the use of weapons and likely learned map-making from a Champlain family friend who was an "engineer and geographer to the King". Fischer emphasizes the exposure Champlain had as a youth and the different strengths he picked up through his family, his education and his town to show that each served him well in the adventures that would come later on.

 The religious turbulence of his youth

Even the small town of Brouage was not immune from the clashes between Calvinists and Roman Catholics that occurred after the Protestant Reformation. Fischer writes about an incident in which a rival port city sent "barges full of sand and rock" to block the channel leading to Brouage and sabotage its trade. After 1628, Brouage was even turned into a garrison by Cardinal Richelieu, its sea trade having been cut off. 
Even though historians cannot confirm whether Champlain was a Protestant or a Catholic, his writings show the influence of a deep "Christian faith". Fischer goes further, drawing parallels between King Henry IV of France and Champlain, arguing that both men detested intolerance and believed it to be "anti-Christian". He claims that both thought religion was a force for social and political stability, faith was an intensely personal choice and religious controversy mattered far less than "piety, humility and good works".

Fischer claims that Champlain gained an understanding of the need for cultural acceptance, but also limited violence to ensure stability from war.

That Champlain may have been the illegitimate son of the King
One of the new theories published in this book is that Champlain was actually the son of French King, Henry IV. Historians such as Marcel Trudel and Hubert Deschamps have previously expressed belief that Champlain was actually the son of an "unknown French nobleman". Fischer, however, said that both Champlain's "close relationship with the King" and "the King’s travel history in the nine months prior to Champlain’s birth" lead him to believe that Henry IV was in fact the father. At a book reception in Brandeis, Fischer stated that, “He was at the right place at the right time, so to speak. It could have happened. Granted that there is exactly zero hard evidence to support that theory, but [if Henry IV were his father] it would explain many anomalies in their relationship. It’s only a possibility, but it’s very clear that the two of them had a very special relationship.”

The challenges of writing biography on Samuel de Champlain 

Many reviewers of Fischer's work pointed out that little is known about Samuel de Champlain- both in the United States and also in Canada. Despite the variety of his achievements, he is a somewhat obscure figure.

There is only a single “authentic likeness . . . is known to survive from his own time”. This likeness is a one-inch engraving wielding an advanced wheel-lock arquebus and with a panache, or a feathery plume in his helmet. Every other portrait or image came much later.

Another is that he wrote "thousands of pages about what he did, but only a few words about who he was" - historians hardly know his birthdate, level of schooling or even whether he was baptized as a Protestant or a Catholic.

Fischer has also offered the view that Champlain may have been forgotten due to the predominance of the Annales school of French historiography. Under its influence, the "structure of society and the details of daily and communal life" were seen as more important subjects for history than great men or major events.

In response to the many questions left unanswered, Fischer devotes a series of Appendices that examine competing theories on subjects from his birthdate to the questions of authorship or authenticity in his surviving writings.

Fischer's views on biography 

In the Introduction to this book, Fischer mentions the need for biography to walk the line between hagiography and iconoclasm.

In an address to the New York Historical Society, Fischer lays out the three rules of biography he picked up from historians Francis Parkman and Samuel Eliot Morison: 
 "Go there"
 "Do it"
 "Then write it"
Partly in deference to this process, the Introduction to the book is subtitled In Search of Champlain and Fischer makes frequent mention of the role of "physical evidence" in knowing history.

Reception 
Tony Horwitz, writing for The Washington Post, described Champlain's Dream as "exhaustively researched" though perhaps too effusive in its praise for Champlain's character. He writes that Champlain seems “almost perfect, and perfectly dull” and though Fischer tries, Champlain remains an abstract figure and doesn't come alive. Moreover, Horwitz describes the near avoidance of Champlain's love life or trust placed in Champlain's own writings of how the Native Americans loved him as odd notes. He adds that the absence of a dramatic event to offer a tight focus (like in Fischer's other books, Washington's Crossing and Paul Revere's Ride) throws off the book's pace.

Max Boot, in The New York Times, takes the view that this work must be considered within the view of how little documentation exists of Champlain's life and how he "remains a relatively obscure corner of our continent’s history". Since Fischer's "plain, unadorned" prose is seeded with "intriguing ideas", the reader's interest is caught by how this man they barely knew anything about was so versatile and accomplished and how smoothly Fischer's narrative of his life fits its big ideas together.

In general, the response was positive, with Champlain's Dream being declared one of the best books of 2008 by the New York Times (100 Notable Books) and Publishers Weekly (Best Books of the Year) as well as a number of regional papers. It was also a runner-up for the 2009 Cundill Prize.

References

Bibliography 

 

2008 non-fiction books
Simon & Schuster books
Samuel de Champlain
History books about exploration